Forty: Live Limited Edition is a live album by English new wave/synth-pop musician Thomas Dolby, released in 2001. It was recorded at a gathering at his Half Moon Bay home in Northern California, celebrating his fortieth birthday, and at another private performance.

Track listing

"The Ability to Swing" – 4:10
"Screen Kiss" – 5:33
"I Love You Goodbye" – 7:21
"I Scare Myself" – 5:56
"One of Our Submarines" – 5:35
"My Brain Is Like a Sieve" – 5:24
"Hyperactive" – 4:37

Personnel
Musicians
 Thomas Dolby – vocals, keyboards, FX, samples
 Brian Salter – electronic wind instrument, keyboards
 Caroline Lavelle – cello, backing vocals
 Leslie Adams – additional vocals

Technical
 Tod Wollersheim – live sound, DA-88 recording
 Thomas Dolby – mixing
 Matt Levine – mixing
 Emanuel Geller – Pro Tools, mastering
 Sylvia Doelz – cover art
 Lawrence Thomas – layout, sleeve design
 Bob Gelman – inside photographs

References

Thomas Dolby albums
2001 live albums